Vilde Bøe Risa (born 13 July 1995) is a Norwegian professional footballer who plays as a midfielder for Manchester United in the English Women's Super League and the Norway national team.

She has previously played for Arna-Bjørnar and Sandviken of the Norwegian Toppserien, and Swedish Damallsvenskan club Kopparbergs/Göteborg FC.

Club career

Arna-Bjørnar
Having come through the youth system at local third-division side Åsane and helping the team reach two youth cup finals, Bøe Risa joined Toppserien side Arna-Bjørnar in 2012. She made her senior top-flight debut on 14 April 2012 as a 63rd-minute substitute for Lisa Naalsund in a 1–1 draw with Røa IL on the opening day of the season. She scored her first goal for the club on 30 June 2012 as Arna-Bjørnar beat Vålerenga 5–0. Rise made 16 league appearances and a further three in the cup in her debut season as Arna-Bjørnar equaled their best ever Toppserien finish in third-place. Bøe Risa established herself as an important player the following season, starting in 12 of 18 appearances as Arna-Bjørnar repeated their third-place finish before her playing time increased again the following year with the team again finishing third.

Bøe Risa was named captain ahead of the 2016 season and played all but three minutes in all competitions, only being withdrawn from a 3–0 defeat to Avaldsnes IL in the 87th minute on 11 June. Having featured in every Arna-Bjørnar match since the start of 2014, she missed the entire 2017 Toppserien season with an ACL injury. She returned in 2018 and recaptured her best form, scoring a career-high seven goals in all competitions.

Kopparbergs/Göteborg FC
In December 2018, Bøe Risa signed a professional contract with Swedish Damallsvenskan club Kopparbergs/Göteborg FC. Göteborg won the Svenska Cupen on 1 May 2019, beating Kristianstads DFF in the final. On 25 September 2019, Bøe Risa made her UEFA Women's Champions League debut, starting in a round of 32 second leg 1–0 win over Bayern Munich. Despite the victory, Göteborg were eliminated on away goals. Bøe Risa signed a one-year contract extension ahead of the 2020 Damallsvenskan season. In July, it was announced Bøe Risa was appointed captain following enforced absences to regular captain Beata Kollmats, and replacements Elin Rubensson and Emma Berglund. On 7 November 2020, Göteborg won their first league title in club history with one game to spare following a 7–0 win over Linköpings FC. Bøe Risa scored twice during the deciding match. On 9 December 2020, Bøe Risa scored her first Champions League goal in a 2–1 loss to Manchester City in the first leg of the round of 32. She signed a one-day contract extension the following week in order to play in the second leg as Göteborg were eliminated 5–1 on aggregate. Despite the league title win, plans were revealed to fold Kopparbergs/Göteborg FC in December 2020 due to financial insecurities. The team was taken over by BK Häcken the following month but Bøe Risa, who had a standing offer to return, elected not to re-sign.

Sandviken
With the search for a foreign club hampered by the COVID-19 pandemic, Bøe Risa trained in her native Norway with Sandviken to keep up her fitness during the offseason and eventually signed a one-year contract with the club on 26 April 2021 ahead of the 2021 season. On 21 June, having appeared three times for Sandviken, Bøe Risa announced the mutual termination of her contract in preparation for a move to another club.

Manchester United
On 20 July 2021, it was announced Bøe Risa had signed a two-year contract with a further option year with English Women's Super League club Manchester United.

International career

Youth
Bøe Risa began representing Norway at under-16 level in 2011. In 2012, she represented the under-17 team during the second round of 2012 UEFA Women's Under-17 Championship qualification. She started all three games as Norway beat Poland and the Republic of Ireland before missing out on qualification with a 4–0 defeat to France.

In October 2020, Bøe Risa was called up to the under-19 squad during the first round of 2013 UEFA Women's Under-19 Championship qualifying. She scored her first international goal at youth level in the opening game against Turkey. Having qualified as the best placed runners-up from the second round, Bøe Risa was named to the squad for the final tournament and started all three games as Norway were eliminated at the group stage having lost to Germany and Finland before beating Sweden in a dead rubber. Norway automatically qualified as hosts for the 2014 UEFA Women's Under-19 Championship and Bøe Risa was selected as captain for the home nation. After a goalless draw with the Netherlands, Norway beat Belgium and Scotland to advance to the semi-finals where they lost to Spain. Bøe Risa started all four games.

Between 2014 and 2016, Bøe Risa continued through the age groups, making 11 appearances for the under-23s including at La Manga and Nordic Tournaments.

Senior
On 19 September 2016, Bøe Risa made her senior international debut for Norway women's national football team as a 65th-minute substitute for Caroline Graham Hansen against Israel during UEFA Euro 2017 qualifying. She scored six minutes into her first international appearance as part of the 5–0 victory. However, she had her hopes of competing at the tournament finals dashed after suffering an ACL injury in February 2017.

It took 12 months for Bøe Risa to recover, making her comeback appearance in February 2018 against Australia during the 2018 Algarve Cup. During 2018, Bøe Risa made four substitute appearances during 2019 FIFA Women's World Cup qualification as Norway topped their group ahead of reigning European champions Netherlands. She was named to the 2019 FIFA Women's World Cup squad the following summer. Bøe Risa started all five of Norway's World Cup games in France as the team reached the quarter-final stage before losing 3–0 to England.

Personal life
Vilde's father, Terje Risa, played 96 matches for SK Brann between 1983 and 1986. He later served on the club's board of directors. After a number of years as a teacher, Terje also became principal of the local academy in Bergen in 2004. Terje died in 2013 at 52 years old after suffering a cardiac arrest during the Skjærsgårdsrittet bicycle race. Having also been a promising handball player in her youth, Vilde cites her father's coaching as inspiration for her to pursue a career in football and strive to play for the national team.

Bøe Risa has been in a relationship with Sparta Prague and Norway international footballer Andreas Vindheim since October 2013.

In May 2017, Bøe Risa graduated from the Western Norway University of Applied Sciences with a bachelor's degree in economics and administration.

Career statistics

Club

International

Scores and results list Norway's goal tally first, score column indicates score after each Bøe Risa goal.

Honours
Kopparbergs/Göteborg FC
Svenska Cupen: 2019
Damallsvenskan: 2020
Norway
Algarve Cup: 2019

References

External links
 
 Norwegian National Team profile 

1995 births
Living people
Footballers from Bergen
Women's association football midfielders
Norwegian women's footballers
Norway women's international footballers
Arna-Bjørnar players
BK Häcken FF players
SK Brann Kvinner players
Manchester United W.F.C. players
Toppserien players
Damallsvenskan players
Women's Super League players
Norwegian expatriate women's footballers
Expatriate women's footballers in Sweden
Norwegian expatriate sportspeople in Sweden
Expatriate women's footballers in England
Norwegian expatriate sportspeople in England
2019 FIFA Women's World Cup players
UEFA Women's Euro 2022 players